In pregnancy terms, quickening is the moment in pregnancy when the pregnant woman starts to feel the fetus' movement in the uterus.

Medical facts
The first natural sensation of quickening may feel like a light tapping or fluttering.  These sensations eventually become stronger and more regular as the pregnancy progresses.  Sometimes, the first movements are mis-attributed to gas or hunger pangs.

A woman's uterine muscles, rather than her abdominal muscles, are first to sense fetal motion.  Therefore, her body weight usually does not have a substantial effect on when movements are initially perceived.  Women who have previously given birth have more relaxed uterine muscles which are more sensitive to fetal motion during subsequent pregnancies. For them fetal motion can sometimes be felt as early as 14 weeks.

Usually, quickening occurs naturally at about the middle of a pregnancy. A woman pregnant for the first time (i.e., a primigravida woman) typically feels fetal movements at about 20–21 weeks, whereas a woman who has given birth at least once will typically feel movements around 18 weeks.

Legal history

The word quick originally meant "alive".  Historically, quickening has sometimes been considered to be the beginning of the possession of "individual life" by the fetus.  British legal scholar William Blackstone explained the subject of quickening in the eighteenth century, relative to feticide and abortion:

Nevertheless, quickening was only one of several standards that were used historically to determine when the right to life attaches to a fetus.  According to the "ancient law" mentioned by Blackstone, another standard was formation of the fetus, which occurs weeks before quickening.  Henry de Bracton explained the ancient law, about five hundred years before Blackstone:

In England in the seventeenth through nineteenth centuries, a woman convicted of a capital crime could claim a delay in her execution if she were pregnant; a woman who did so was said to "plead the belly".  The law held that no women could be granted a second reprieve from the original sentence on the ground of subsequent pregnancy, even if the fetus had quickened.   In Ireland on 16 March 1831 Baron Pennefather in Limerick stated that pregnancy was not alone sufficient for a delay but there had to be quickening.

See also

Notes

External links
First Fetal Movement: Quickening, American Pregnancy Association.
Fetal movement: Feeling your baby kick, babycenter.com.

Midwifery